Gentlemen's Agreement is a Barbershop quartet that won the 1971 SPEBSQSA international competition. Members Al Rehkop and Glenn Van Tassel had also won in the 1966 contest with the Auto Towners quartet.

External links 
 AIC entry (archived)

Barbershop quartets
Barbershop Harmony Society